Trifon Zarezan is a Bulgarian national custom observed on the 1st and 14th of February in honor of Saint Tryphon.

It is celebrated as a professional holiday by wine growers, falconers, gardeners and innkeepers. The day historically marks the beginning of grape pruning. It usually includes a variety of rituals performed by both men and women alike.

References 

Bulgarian traditions
Agriculture in Bulgaria
Winemaking
Viticulture